Holger Glandorf (born 30 March 1983) is a German retired handball player.

He competed at the 2008 Summer Olympics in Beijing, where the German team placed 9th. He announced his retirement from the national team on 1 September 2014, but returned for the 2017 World Men's Handball Championship.

He retired in May 2020.

References

External links

1983 births
Living people
Sportspeople from Osnabrück
German male handball players
Olympic handball players of Germany
Handball players at the 2008 Summer Olympics
Handball-Bundesliga players
SG Flensburg-Handewitt players
HSG Nordhorn-Lingen players